Altan Jalab is a village in Afghanistan. At the turn of the 20th century, it has been the end of the 30th stage on the Jalalabad-Faizabad-Rustak road, about halfway between Faizabad and Rustak. The area is also said to have been the location of extensive ruins of the town and fort of Kala-i-Zafar. More recently, Altan Jalab has been reported as the name of a small town about 27 miles southwest of Faizabad, with a stream in the vicinity.

References

Populated places in Argo District